The Musarambagh Metro Station is located on the Red Line of the Hyderabad Metro.

History 
It was opened on 24 September 2018.

The station

Structure
Musarambagh elevated metro station situated on the Red Line of Hyderabad Metro.

Facilities
The stations have staircases, elevators and escalators from the street level to the platform level which provide easy and comfortable access. Also, operation panels inside the elevators are installed at a level that can be conveniently operated by all passengers, including differently-abled and elderly citizens.

Station layout
Street Level This is the first level where passengers may park their vehicles and view the local area map.

Concourse level Ticketing office or Ticket Vending Machines (TVMs) is located here. Retail outlets and other facilities like washrooms, ATMs, first aid, etc., will be available in this area.

Platform level  This layer consists of two platforms. Trains takes passengers from this level.

Train service 
Three coaches trains runs through this station between Miyapur and LB Nagar every 3.5 – 7 minutes.

References

Hyderabad Metro stations
2018 establishments in Telangana